Anaeromusa acidaminophila  is a bacterium from the genus of Anaeroarcus which has been isolated from an anaerobic purification plant.

References

Further reading

External links
Type strain of Anaeromusa acidaminophila at BacDive -  the Bacterial Diversity Metadatabase	

Negativicutes
Bacteria described in 1999